The Louisville Cardinals women's basketball team represents the University of Louisville in women's basketball. The school competes in the Atlantic Coast Conference in Division I of the National Collegiate Athletic Association (NCAA). The Cardinals play home basketball games at KFC Yum! Center in Louisville, Kentucky.

Louisville's current head coach is Jeff Walz, who joined the team in 2007. Under his leadership the school moved into the top 15 in attendance his first year, averaging 6,456 fans per game.

Current roster

History
The Cardinals have reached the NCAA Tournament in 1983, 1984, 1993, 1995, 1997, 1998, 1999, 2001, 2005, 2006, 2007, 2008, 2009, 2011, 2012, 2013, 2014, 2015, 2016, 2017, 2018, 2019, 2021, 2022, and 2023. They reached the Final Four 4 times in 2009, 2013, 2018, and 2022; losing in the title game twice (09,13). They have been in six conferences, playing in the Kentucky Women's Intercollegiate Conference from 1978 to 1981, the Metro Conference from 1981 to 1995, Conference USA from 1995 to 2005, the Big East Conference from 2005 to 2013, the American Athletic Conference for the 2013–14 season, and the Atlantic Coast Conference since 2014.

Asia Durr Era (2015–2019)

Asia Durr was named ACC Player of the Year two years in a row in 2018 and 2019. Durr, received 29 of 31 votes for pre-season All-American. Durr was named to the All-American list for 2019, and was nominated for the John. R Wooden Award in the same season. In high school she was also selected as the Miss Georgia Girls Basketball Player of the Year twice, 2014 and 2015.

Season-by-season Results

NCAA tournament results

2023

References

External links
 

 
1975 establishments in Kentucky
Basketball teams established in 1975